Rearick is a surname. Notable people with the surname include:

Chris Rearick (born 1987), American baseball player
Dave Rearick (born 1932), American rock climber and mathematician

See also
Janet Cox-Rearick (1930–2018), American art historian

English-language surnames